Brookings is a city in Brookings County, South Dakota, United States. Brookings is South Dakota's fourth largest city, with a population of 23,377 at the 2020 census. It is the county seat of Brookings County, and home to South Dakota State University, the state's largest institution of higher education. Also in Brookings are the South Dakota Art Museum, the Children's Museum of South Dakota, the annual Brookings Summer Arts Festival, and the headquarters of several manufacturing companies and agricultural operations.

History

Pioneer
The county and city were both named after one of South Dakota's pioneer promoters, Wilmot Brookings. Brookings set out for the Dakota Territory in June 1857. He arrived at Sioux Falls on August 27, 1857, and became one of the first settlers there. He and his group represented the Western Town Company. After a time in Sioux Falls, Brookings and a companion set out for the Yankton area to locate a town in an area that was soon to be ceded by the Native Americans. This trip began in January 1858, and the two soon encountered a blizzard that froze Brookings's feet, which both had to be amputated.

Brookings rose to a high position in the Territory, becoming a member of the Squatter Territorial Legislature and later elected Squatter Governor. He then was appointed superintendent of a road that was to be built from the Minnesota state line west to the Missouri River about 30 miles north of Ft. Pierre. It was during this road's construction that Brookings came into contact with land that was part of this county at the time. He made settlement of this area possible for many people.

Medary
The first real town organized in Brookings County was Medary, in 1857. Before that, the area had been traveled and utilized only by Native Americans, with a few indistinct traces left showing the penetration of the area by explorers, missionaries, trappers, and traders. Along with Sioux Falls and Flandreau, Medary was one of the first three European settlements established in South Dakota.

The first site of Medary was located by the Dakota Land Company of Minnesota, led by Alpheus G. Fuller and Franklin J. DeWitt and accompanied by engineer Samuel A. Medary, Jr. In 1857, the men put up quarters in preparation to live out the winter in Medary. Many other settlers moved into the area in 1858. But in the spring of that year, a large group of Yankton and Yanktonnia Indians drove the settlers from the area, and Medary remained nearly abandoned for the next 11 years.

In 1869, a group of 10 Norwegian pioneers moved west into the Dakota Territory and resettled the area of Medary, about four and a half miles south of present-day Brookings. The county of Brookings was formally organized in Medary in Martin Trygstad's cabin on July 3, 1871. The county's original boundaries extended to two miles south of Flandreau. The territorial legislature established the current boundaries on January 8, 1873. Two other small settlements, Oakwood and Fountain, appeared in the Brookings County area around this time. All three hoped to be the town the railroad would decide to run through as it moved westward. The railroad bypassed Medary, so it became a ghost town.

Railroad
In fact, the railroad bypassed all three towns. When the businessmen of Medary and Fountain found out that the railroad had no plans to run through the two towns, they began a push to find a central location. Many private meetings and much effort on the part of the men of Medary and Fountain led the railroad to lay its tracks through what became the city of Brookings.

In a letter sent to Chicago on September 30, 1879, Land Commissioner Charles E. Simmons communicated the layout of the series of towns in Brookings County for the railroad to pass through: Aurora, Brookings, and Volga. Many merchants of Medary and Fountain packed up their businesses and belongings and moved to Brookings, which was surveyed and platted on October 3 and 4, 1879. Fountain ceased to exist; Medary and Oakwood remained for a while but eventually faded away. A monument still stands at the site of the old Medary as a reminder of the people who once lived there.

The railroad crossed the Minnesota state line into Brookings County on October 2, 1879. With tracks being built at about one mile per day, the track and first train reached Brookings's Main Street on October 18, 1879. The railroad station opened a month later.

Brookings was laid out in 1880.

Employment
According to the City's 2016 Comprehensive Annual Financial Report, its largest employers are:

Brookings's unemployment rate is 2.7%, well below the national average of 4.7%.

Bel Brands USA, Inc., a subsidiary of Paris-based multinational Fromageries BEL or Bel Group, began commercial construction of a 170,000-square-foot Babybel cheese production plant in 2014 in the city's Foster Addition north of the Swiftel Center. The project added 250 new jobs in Brookings by the end of 2014. Rainbow Play Systems is also headquartered in Brookings.

Geography
Brookings is located at  (44.306253, −96.788105).

Brookings has been assigned ZIP codes 57006 and 57007 as well as the FIPS place code 07580.

Climate
Brookings experiences a humid continental climate (Köppen Dfb), which is characterized by warm, relatively humid summers and cold, dry winters, and is in USDA Hardiness Zones 4. Snowfall occurs mostly in light to moderate amounts, totaling . Precipitation, at  annually, is concentrated in the warmer months.

Demographics

2010 census
As of the census of 2010, there were 22,056 people, 8,159 households, and 3,836 families living in the city. The racial makeup of the city was 92.1% White, 1.1% African American, 1.0% Native American, 3.7% Asian, 0.5% from other races, and 1.6% from two or more races. Hispanic or Latino of any race were 1.5% of the population.

There were 8,159 households, of which 23.2% had children under the age of 18 living with them, 37.5% were married couples living together, 6.5% had a female householder with no husband present, 3.0% had a male householder with no wife present, and 53.0% were non-families. 32.6% of all households were made up of individuals, and 7.8% had someone living alone who was 65 years of age or older. The average household size was 2.29 and the average family size was 2.93.

The median age in the city was 23.5 years. 16.1% of residents were under the age of 18; 38% were between the ages of 18 and 24; 22.3% were from 25 to 44; 15.2% were from 45 to 64; and 8.4% were 65 years of age or older. The gender makeup of the city was 51.1% male and 48.9% female.

2000 census
As of the census of 2000, there were 18,504 people, 6,971 households, and 3,422 families living in the city. The population density was 1,549.7 people per square mile (598.4/km2). There were 7,359 housing units at an average density of 616.3 per square mile (238.0/km2). The racial makeup of the city was 95.49% White, 0.44% African American, 0.99% Native American, 1.88% Asian, 0.05% Pacific Islander, 0.26% from other races, and 0.88% from two or more races. Hispanic or Latino of any race were 0.75% of the population.

There were 6,971 households, out of which 24.9% had children under the age of 18 living with them, 39.5% were married couples living together, 7.3% had a female householder with no husband present, and 50.9% were non-families. 34.4% of all households were made up of individuals, and 9.0% had someone living alone who was 65 years of age or older. The average household size was 2.26 and the average family size was 2.93.

In the city, the population was spread out, with 17.4% under the age of 18, 36.6% from 18 to 24, 22.0% from 25 to 44, 14.0% from 45 to 64, and 9.9% who were 65 years of age or older. The median age was 24 years. For every 100 females, there were 99.7 males. For every 100 females age 18 and over, there were 98.6 males.

As of 2000 the median income for a household in the city was $31,266, and the median income for a family was $49,246. Males had a median income of $31,276 versus $22,763 for females. The per capita income for the city was $17,028. About 7.3% of families and 18.5% of the population were below the poverty line, including 12.7% of those under age 18 and 6.6% of those age 65 or over.

Ancestry
The two largest ancestries in the city are:
 44.5% German
 24.8% Norwegian

Religion
As of 2010, 60.7% of Brookings's population claimed affiliation with a religious congregation. The largest such groups were:

 Lutheran – 29%
 Roman Catholic – 22%
 Methodist – 10%
 Wesleyan - 10%
 All other religious congregations - 30%

Brookings is also home to the Institute of Lutheran Theology, a pan-denominational Lutheran seminary. Students come from across the Lutheran spectrum, with the majority affiliated with one of three denominations; the North American Lutheran Church, Lutheran Congregations in Mission for Christ and the Canadian Association of Lutheran Congregations.

Education 
The Brookings School District serves students in pre-kindergarten through twelfth grade. South Dakota State University, the state's largest college, is in Brookings.

Media

Newspaper 
The Brookings Register publishes daily Monday through Saturday morning with a focus on local news and sports. It serves all of Brookings County and parts of Hamlin, Deuel, Kingsbury, Lake and Moody Counties in South Dakota and Lincoln County, Minnesota.

AM Radio

FM Radio

Transportation

Roads

 Interstate 29-while Exits 132 and 133 both are located within the city limits, Exit 132 is the only one signed for Brookings
 U.S. Highway 14
 
 U.S. Highway 14 Bypass

Airport
Brookings Regional Airport serves the City of Brookings.  A major reconstruction of the airport took place in 2012.

Points of interest

 McCrory Gardens and South Dakota Arboretum
 South Dakota Art Museum
 South Dakota Agricultural Heritage Museum
 Children's Museum of South Dakota
 Coughlin Campanile
 South Dakota State University
 Frost Arena
 Coughlin-Alumni Stadium
 Dana J. Dykhouse Stadium

Popular culture
 Brookings is the hometown of the main character in Netflix's series Love, Gus Cruikshank.
 Brookings is the hometown of Charles Percy in the ABC medical drama Grey's Anatomy.
 Brookings (misspelled as Brookins) is mentioned several times in By the Shores of Silver Lake by Laura Ingalls Wilder as a nearby town, where Charles Ingalls went to register the lot.
On October 7, 2005, Brookings was featured on the reality-TV show Three Wishes.

Notable people
Jacob M. Appel, wrote portions of Coulrophobia & Fata Morgana in Brookings Public Library
Robert H. Burris, biochemist, educated in Brookings
Ray Ellefson, professional basketball player, born in Brookings
Geraldine Fenn, children's activist, born in Brookings
Cheris Kramarae, co-author of A Feminist Dictionary, born in Brookings
Gene Okerlund, professional wrestling announcer, born in Brookings
Stephen Foster Briggs, co-founder of Briggs & Stratton, educated in Brookings

References

External links

 City of Brookings
 BrookingsSD.com community portal

 
Cities in Brookings County, South Dakota
Cities in South Dakota
County seats in South Dakota
Populated places established in 1857
Micropolitan areas of South Dakota
1857 establishments in Minnesota Territory